Andrey Golubev and Nikola Mektić were the defending champions but chose not to defend their title.

Gero Kretschmer and Alexander Satschko won the title after defeating Sekou Bangoura and Tristan-Samuel Weissborn 6–4, 7–6(7–4) in the final.

Seeds

Draw

External Links
 Main Draw

Internazionali di Tennis Citta di Vicenza - Doubles
2017 Doubles
Internazionali di Tennis Citta di Vicenza - Doubles